Xerxes: The Fall of the House of Darius and the Rise of Alexander is a 2018 historically inspired comic book limited series written and illustrated by Frank Miller.  It acts as a prequel and sequel to the events chronicled in Miller's earlier series 300, a fictional retelling of the Battle of Thermopylae and garnered a mixed reception.

Parts of the series were loosely adapted for the 2014 film 300: Rise of an Empire, a sequel to the 2006 film adaptation of 300.  However, the comic series was not actually published until 2018, four years after the film's release.

Synopsis

Chapter One
In 490 BC, Darius I invades mainland Greece in retaliation for the Ionian Revolt's destruction of Sardis, with Athens's aid.  An advance scouting party is slaughtered by a small detachment of Athenians, led by Themistokles and Aeskylos.  The following day, at Marathon, General Miltiades comes up with a radical strategy to abandon the traditional phalanx and charge the numerically superior Persian force with a battle line that has been deliberately thinned in order to allow the Greeks to flank the Persians and catch them in a pincer.  The strategy works, and the Persian force is slaughtered, but Miltiades orders the army to return to Athens immediately, knowing that the main body of Darius's force is headed there by sea.

Chapter Two 
The army returns to Athens ahead of the Persians, but Militades sees they are hopelessly outnumbered, and begs to be killed for his failure.  Themistokles, however, has a plan: all the citizens of Athens, including women and the elderly, are dressed in armor and arrayed on the shore, presenting the image of a mighty army.  Darius balks from landing, and decides to send a detachment of Androsians to test the Athenians.  The Androsians' barges are destroyed by arrows lit with Greek fire, which acts as a diversion for Aeskylos to swim between the Persian ships, mount a cliff above Darius's flagship, and rain javelins onto the deck, killing Darius and several of his Immortals.  Darius dies in his son Xerxes's arms, warning his son not to repeat his mistake, and to leave the Greeks in peace.  The Persian navy retreats, but Themistokles feels no sense of triumph, believing that Xerxes's survival will come back to haunt them.

Chapter Three 
In 479 BC, Xerxes journeys into the desert of Najd, communing with the spirits of his ancestors and emerging as a mighty god-king.  Returning to his capital, he demands that the "perfect" woman be found to be his wife, and he finds her in Esther of Judea, who promises all her love to the king if he will free her people.  There is ambiguity as to what happens next: Xerxes either orders Zion burned to ash, "freeing" the Jewish people to wander homeless, or else he halts the campaign of genocide commenced by his father and saves the Jews from annihilation, who declare a national holiday (Purim) in his honor.

After his ignominious defeat in Greece, Xerxes returns to Persia, but his plans for his empire are cut short by his assassination in 465 BC.  Again, there is ambiguity about the exact manner of his assassination: whether he was struck down in battle, or quietly poisoned.

Chapter Four 
336 BC: under Darius III, the Persian Empire is larger and mightier than ever before.  But Alexander the Great conquers all of Greece and invades Persia, defeating Darius's army at Issus in 333 BC.  Darius flees the battle and his wife and children are taken hostage by Alexander, who orders their lives spared.

Chapter Five 
331 BC: Incensed by Alexander's refusal to return his wife and family, Darius confronts the Greeks again, at Gaugamela.  Again, the Persians are defeated and Darius flees to Babylon, while the Greeks sack Susa and Persepolis.  Darius is finally assassinated in 330 BC by his cousin Bessus.  Alexander himself oversees Darius's funeral, saluting him as a worthy rival, while anticipating his own plans to conquer the entire known world, believing that nothing is impossible.

Film adaptation

In June 2008, producers Mark Canton, Gianni Nunnari and Bernie Goldmann revealed that work had begun on a sequel to 300 based on the then-unpublished Xerxes, titled 300: Rise of an Empire. The film, directed by Noam Murro and produced by 300 director Zack Snyder, focuses on the Athenian admiral, Themistocles, portrayed by Australian actor Sullivan Stapleton, and was released on March 7, 2014.

In May 2021, Snyder revealed he had written a third film, adapting the Alexander the Great segments of Xerxes as a conclusion to the 300 trilogy but Warner Bros. was not interested in it.

References

Comics set in ancient Greece
Comics set in ancient Persia
Comics set in the 5th century BC
Battle of Thermopylae
Fantasy comics
War comics
Comics by Frank Miller (comics)
Dark Horse Comics adapted into films
Comics based on real people
Cultural depictions of Xerxes I
Cultural depictions of Darius the Great
Cultural depictions of Alexander the Great
Cultural depictions of Esther